Alexandros (Alekos) Zartaloudis (1929 – February 7, 2007) was a Greek actor. He studied at drama school with Kostas Mihailidis and he worked in theater alongside Aliki Vougiouklaki and Dimitris Papamichail. He later moved to the US. He took part in many movies along with TV shows.

Filmography

As cinematographer

Television

References

External links

1929 births
2007 deaths
Greek male actors
People from Chios